Action is the sixteenth studio album by the Japanese rock duo B'z, released on December 5, 2007. It sold 292,687 copies in its first week, reaching #1 at Oricon.

The song "Friction" was featured in the video game Burnout Dominator and was later on Burnout Paradise, the song was the band's first English song to be sold in the US though the iTunes Store. Stone Temple Pilots bassist Robert DeLeo provides bass on the songs "Super Love Song" and "Warui Yume".

Track listing 

  – 3:05
  – 3:47
 Super Love Song – 3:59
  – 3:59
  – 3:38
  – 3:25 
 Friction -Lap2- – 3:05
 One On One – 4:35
  – 5:53
  – 4:59
  – 4:34
 Hometown Boys' March – 4:26
  – 4:51
  – 3:09
  – 3:30
  – 5:10
 Buddy – 3:27

Certifications

References

External links
B'z official Web site (in Japanese)
ACTION on B'z no bise (album review) 

B'z albums
Being Inc. albums
2007 albums
Japanese-language albums